The Washington State Democratic Party is the affiliate of the Democratic Party in the U.S. state of Washington, headquartered in Seattle. It is also commonly referred to as the Washington State Democrats and the Washington Democratic Party. It is currently the dominant party in the state, controlling the majority of Washington's U.S. House seats, both U.S. Senate seats, both houses of the state legislature, and the governorship.

Organization

Washington State Democratic Central Committee (WSDCC)
 Chair: Shasti Conrad

 Vice-Chair: David Green
 Treasurer: Julie Johnson
 Secretary: Rob Dolin

County party organizations
Each of Washington's 39 counties has a county democratic central committee, which operates within that county and sends two delegates (which may not share the same gender identity) to the State Central Committee.

Legislative district organizations
Each of Washington's 49 legislative districts has a local Democratic party organization, which operates within that district and sends two delegates (which may not share the same gender identity) to the State Central Committee.

Other state organizations
Washington state has organizations such as the High School Democrats of Washington, the College Democrats of Washington, and the Young Democrats of Washington, separate from the State Central Committee.

Current elected officials
The following popularly-elected offices are held by Democrats:

U.S. Senate
Since 2001, Democrats have controlled both of Washington's seats in the Senate:

U.S. House of Representatives
Democrats control a majority; they hold eight of the state's ten seats in the House following the 2020 census:

Statewide officeholders
Democrats hold all nine of Washington's constitutional offices.

Legislative leadership
 Senate president pro tempore: Karen Keiser
 Senate majority leader: Andy Billig
 Speaker of the House: Laurie Jinkins
 Speaker pro tempore of the House: Tina Orwall
 House majority leader: Pat Sullivan

Election results

Presidential

Senatorial

Gubernatorial

See also

 Washington State Republican Party

Notes

References

External links
Washington State Democratic Party
2012 Washington State Democratic Party Platform

 
Democratic Party
Democratic Party (United States) by state